The 26th Cuban National Series was won by Vegueros. The team, from Pinar del Río Province, won the western zone during the regular season, and was then able to win the four-team-round-robin-playoffs, which had been instituted the previous season.

Standings

Western zone

Eastern zone

Playoffs

References

 (Note - text is printed in a white font on a white background, depending on browser used.)

Cuban National Series seasons
Cuban National Series
Base
Base